Salah ud Din Khan is a Pakistani politician who was a Member of the Provincial Assembly of the Punjab, from May 2013 to May 2018.

Early life and education
He was born on 8 October 1963 in Mianwali.

He has a degree of Bachelor of Medicine and Bachelor of Surgery which he obtained in 1988 from Nishtar Medical College and has a degree of Master of Science in General Surgery where he received in 2002 from Quaid-i-Azam University.

Political career

He was elected to the Provincial Assembly of the Punjab as a candidate of Pakistan Tehreek-e-Insaf from Constituency PP-44 (Mianwali-II) in 2013 Pakistani general election.

References

Living people
Punjab MPAs 2013–2018
1963 births
Pakistan Tehreek-e-Insaf politicians
Quaid-i-Azam University alumni
People from Mianwali District